"Allamagoosa" is a science fiction short story by English author Eric Frank Russell, originally published in the May 1955 issue of Astounding Science Fiction and collected in The Hugo Winners (1962), The Best Of Eric Frank Russell (1978), and Major Ingredients: The Selected Short Stories of Eric Frank Russell (2000).

Plot summary
While preparing for an inspection, the crew of the starship Bustler reread their manifest and discover that they are supposed to have something called an "offog"; however, nobody knows what that is. They devise a plan to pass the inspection anyway: going on the assumption that nobody else would know what it is either, they simply manufacture a small box with blinkenlights and feed the commanding officer some technobabble about what the device does. The plan seems to work, and the ship passes the inspection.

The ship is soon ordered back to Earth for overhaul; the crew, fearing that their deception will soon be uncovered, try to get rid of the "offog" and message headquarters that it "came apart under gravitational stress". Two days later, the entire fleet is ordered to be grounded, and the crew realizes that "offog" was a typo of "off.dog", short for "official dog", and the headquarters are now grounding the fleet to conduct an investigation about how an animal could come apart under gravitational stress.

Reception
"Allamagoosa" won the 1955 Hugo Award for Best Short Story.

John Joseph Adams has called it "uproariously funny".

James Nicoll has commented that it is "apparently based on an urban legend". In fact, it is essentially a science-fictional retelling of a traditional tall story called "The Shovewood".

References

External links

Allamagoosa at webarchive of scifi.com

1955 short stories
Science fiction short stories
Science fiction comedy
Hugo Award for Best Short Story winning works
Works originally published in Analog Science Fiction and Fact